Rimatara Airport is an airport on Rimatara in French Polynesia . The airport was built in 2006.

The airport was renovated in 2018.

Airlines and destinations

Statistics

References

Airports in French Polynesia